Samwel Mushai Kimani (born 26 December 1989) is a visually impaired middle-distance runner from Kenya. He won the 5000 m – T11 event at the 2016 Paralympics. Previously he won a silver and a gold medal in the 1500 m – T11 at the 2008 and 2012 Paralympics, respectively. Kimani won gold in the 2017 Para Athletics championships in London on Friday 21 July in the T11 1500m.

References

External links 

 

Paralympic athletes of Kenya
Paralympic gold medalists for Kenya
Paralympic silver medalists for Kenya
1989 births
Living people
World record holders in Paralympic athletics
Medalists at the 2008 Summer Paralympics
Athletes (track and field) at the 2008 Summer Paralympics
Athletes (track and field) at the 2012 Summer Paralympics
Athletes (track and field) at the 2016 Summer Paralympics
Medalists at the 2012 Summer Paralympics
Medalists at the 2016 Summer Paralympics
African Games bronze medalists for Kenya
African Games medalists in athletics (track and field)
Athletes (track and field) at the 2015 African Games
Paralympic gold medalists in athletics (track and field)
World Para Athletics Championships winners
Athletes (track and field) at the 2020 Summer Paralympics
Kenyan male middle-distance runners
21st-century Kenyan people